Miguel Pujol (born 22 September 1999 in São Paulo) is an Argentinian professional squash player. As of November 2021, he was ranked number 788 in the world.

References

1999 births
Living people
Argentine male squash players